This is a list of earthquakes in 1998. Only earthquakes of magnitude 6 or above are included, unless they result in damage or casualties, or are notable for some other reason. All dates are listed according to UTC time. Maximum intensities are indicated on the Modified Mercalli intensity scale, and all data are sourced from the United States Geological Survey.

By death toll

At least 10 dead.

By magnitude

By month

January

February

March

April

May

June

July

August

September

October

November

December

See also
 
 Lists of 20th-century earthquakes
 Lists of earthquakes by year

References

1998
1998
1998 earthquakes
1998-related lists